Laura Jane Massaro  (née Lengthorn; born 2 November 1983) is a retired professional squash player from England.

Career
She was born in Great Yarmouth and attended Albany High School, Chorley, which is now called Albany Academy. In July 2007, she married Danny Massaro and became Laura Lengthorn-Massaro. She subsequently dropped 'Lengthorn' from her name and is now known professionally as Laura Massaro.

She won her first top-level title at the German Open in 2004 and went on to become British Open champion in 2013 and World Champion in 2014, so become the first Englishwoman to hold both titles at once. She is also a three-time silver medallist for England in Commonwealth Games.

Massaro was shortlisted for the Sunday Times Sky Sports Sportswomen of the Year awards. She won the WISPA Player of the Year award in 2011. She won the US Open and the Cleveland Classic in 2011, the Sharm El Sheikh Open in 2010, and the Monte Carlo Classic in 2008. In 2010, she was part of the English team that won the silver medal at the 2010 Women's World Team Squash Championships.

Massaro also won the British National Squash Championships in 2011, defeating Jenny Duncalf in the final 7–11, 11–9, 7–11, 11–7, 11–2. She had previously finished runner-up at the championships in 2008 (losing in the final to Alison Waters 11–6, 7–11, 8–11, 9–11).

At the 2010 Commonwealth Games, Massaro won a silver medal in the women's doubles (partnering Jenny Duncalf). She followed up four years later at the 2014 Commonwealth Games with two silver medals: silver in singles after finishing runner-up to Nicol David and another silver in doubles with Duncalf.

In 2012, she was part of the England team that won the silver medal at the 2012 Women's World Team Squash Championships. Massaro won the British Open in 2013. She was the first English woman to do so in 22 years.

After starting 2014 brightly by winning the WSA World Tour title in Chicago, Massaro won the biggest title of her career to date at the 2013 World Open in Penang upon beating Nour El Sherbini in the final. Her achievement, alongside that of reigning men's world champion Nick Matthew, meant that England had two reigning world squash champions for the first time.

Massaro's exceptional 2014 season continued when she was runner-up to David at the British Open in Hull in May. At the 2014 Commonwealth Games in Glasgow in July, Massaro went unbeaten through the women's singles – including a semi-final against compatriot Alison Waters – before falling to David in the gold medal match. She and Duncalf then joined forces in the doubles and won through to the final, where they lost to Indians Dipika Pallikal and Joshna Chinappa in straight games.

October saw Massaro reach the quarter-finals of the US Open, where she lost to Nour El-Sherbini. In December, she was part of the team that helped England reclaim the world team title by winning the gold medal at the 2014 Women's World Team Squash Championships; she had previously won silver on three occasions.

In 2015, she progressed to her third British Open final in succession before losing out to eventual victor Camille Serme in the 2015 Women's British Open Squash Championship.

Massaro started her 2015/16 season in strong fashion as she achieved victory at the US Open and Qatar Classic. Upon beating world No. 1 Raneem El Weleily (who herself ended David's 9-year unbroken streak as world No. 1 several months prior) in the semi-finals of the Hong Kong Open, she became the third Englishwoman (and first since 2004) to ascend to the top of the world rankings.

In 2016, she was part of the English team that won the silver medal at the 2016 Women's World Team Squash Championships. In 2018, she was part of the English team that won the silver medal at the 2018 Women's World Team Squash Championships.

Massaro retired at the end of the 2018/19 season and was appointed Member of the Order of the British Empire (MBE) in the 2020 New Year Honours for services to squash.

Sponsors
Laura's sponsors included 305SQUASH for clothing, Head for rackets, Asics for shoes, Technifibre for strings, UK Fast, Proto-Col and CourtCare and Corkhills Volkswagen in Wigan. Laura also partnered with HFE (Health and Fitness Education) in relation to yoga.

World Open

Finals: 3 (1 title, 2 runner-up)

Major World Series final appearances

British Open: 4 finals (2 titles, 2 runner-up)

Hong Kong Open: 1 final (1 runner-up)

Qatar Classic: 1 final (1 title)

U.S. Open: 3 finals (2 titles, 1 runner-up)

Kuala Lumpur Open: 1 final (1 title)

Tournament of Champions: 1 final (1 runner-up)

See also
 Official Women's Squash World Ranking
 WISPA Awards

References

External links 

 
 
 
 
 

1983 births
Living people
English female squash players
Commonwealth Games silver medallists for England
Commonwealth Games medallists in squash
Squash players at the 2010 Commonwealth Games
Squash players at the 2014 Commonwealth Games
Squash players at the 2018 Commonwealth Games
Sportspeople from Great Yarmouth
Sportspeople from Preston, Lancashire
Members of the Order of the British Empire
Medallists at the 2010 Commonwealth Games
Medallists at the 2014 Commonwealth Games